The Ozark Festival Orchestra is an independent, self-sustaining, established orchestra residing in a small city in the Ozarks --- Monett, Missouri, population 7,396.  The ensemble of 40 members commissions new works, features regional and national guest soloists, and hosts a Young Artists competition annually.  It is uncommon for an American city of this size to host an orchestra, although many small American towns do have a community band.

The OFO has a five-concert season starting in October and ending in April or May.

The OFO completed its 38th season in the spring of 2018; this was the 4th season for the current conductor/musical director, Todd Borgmann.  Former musical directors include Ken Meisinger, Jordan Tang  and David Goza.

References

American orchestras
Musical groups established in 1980
Performing arts in Missouri
Musical groups from Missouri